Spektrum may refer to:
 Oslo Spektrum, a sports, event and concert venue in Oslo, Norway
 Trondheim Spektrum, a sports and event venue in Trondheim, Norway
 Spektrum Flyers, a former ice hockey team based in Oslo
 Spektrum RC line of RC Hobby radio systems from the American company of the same name
 Spektrum (band), a band who had a number one on the UK Dance Chart in 2007
 Spektrum (building), an office tower in Warsaw, Poland
 Spektrum (magazine), a Norwegian literary and cultural magazine, issued from 1946 to 1954